Punekar is a surname native to Indian state of Maharashtra. Punekar means an inhabitant or native of Pune.

These people are well disciplined in their daily routine and straightforward in behaviour.

Notable people
Notable people with the surname include:

Shankar Mokashi Punekar - a well known writer in the Kannada language.
Surekha Punekar - Folk dancer
Rekha Punekar- an Indian cricketer
Sachin Anil Punekar - an Indian botanist and ornithologist

Indian surnames
Indian Hindus

History of Pune district
Indian families
Hindu families